This is a list of governors of the Austrian state of Salzburg:

See also
Salzburg

List
Salzburg
Governors